Emil D. Munch (December 12, 1831 – August 30, 1887) was an American politician and businessman.

Munch was born in Halberstadt, Prussia. He emigrated to the United States in 1849 and settled in Taylors Falls, Minnesota, in 1852, and then in Chengwatana, Minnesota, in 1857. He was in the lumber industry and owned a sawmill. Munch served in the Minnesota House of Representatives in 1860 and 1861. He was a Republican. During the American Civil War, Munch served in the 1st Minnesota Light Artillery Battery and was commissioned a major. He was wounded during the American Civil War. Munch serve as Minnesota State Treasurer from 1868 to 1872. He continued to be involved in the lumber business. Munch also operated a flour mill in Afton, Minnesota. He died in Afton, Minnesota.

Notes

External links

1831 births
1887 deaths
Prussian emigrants to the United States
People from Halberstadt
People from Pine County, Minnesota
People of Minnesota in the American Civil War
Businesspeople from Minnesota
State treasurers of Minnesota
Republican Party members of the Minnesota House of Representatives
19th-century American politicians
19th-century American businesspeople